The Narrandera Argus, previously published as The Narandera Argus and Riverina Advertiser, is a weekly English language compact format newspaper published in Narandera, New South Wales (now officially "Narrandera").

History
First published in 1880, The Narrandera Argus and Riverina Advertiser was published until 1953 when it changed its title to Narrandera Argus, which is still in publication. It was published by James Ashton from 1892 and later by Donald M'Neil Turner. A rival newspaper, the Narrandera Ensign, was established in 1886. This paper promoted protectionism while the Argus promoted free trade.

The paper currently has a circulation of 2,000 across Narrandera, Leeton, Yanco, Griffith, Coolamon, Ganmain, Matong and Grong Grong.

Digitisation
The paper has been digitised as part of the Australian Newspapers Digitisation Program project of the National Library of Australia.

See also
List of newspapers in Australia
List of newspapers in New South Wales

References

External links
Official website

Newspapers published in New South Wales
Newspapers on Trove
Weekly newspapers published in Australia